Paka Chuku (Quechua paka eagle, chuku hat, "eagle hat", also spelled Pacachuco) is a mountain in the Bolivian Andes which reaches a height of approximately . It is located in the Potosí Department, Charcas Province, San Pedro de Buena Vista Municipality. Puka Chuku lies southeast of Puka Urqu. The Ch'alla Mayu flows along its northern slope.

References 

Mountains of Potosí Department